"Peace Otodoke!!" is the tenth single released by Japanese singer Ami Suzuki under label Avex Trax. It was released on 7 March 2007.

Information
"Peace Otodoke!!" would be the second of the three collaboration Weekly single to be released. This will be the first time Ami has collaboration project with THC!!.

"Peace Otodoke!!" is a limited-release single.

Track list
 Peace Otodoke!!
 Peace Otodoke!!: 夏の湘南キャンペーンセットver.
 Narration Drama「join」#2: The Days Before

Charts
Oricon Sales Chart (Japan)

Ami Suzuki songs
2007 singles
2007 songs
Songs written by Ami Suzuki
Avex Trax singles